Wayne Conrad is a former all-star and Grey Cup champion center who played six seasons for the Montreal Alouettes of the Canadian Football League, winning two Grey Cup Championships. He played 80 regular season games for the Larks.

In 2008 Conrad auctioned off his jersey and Grey Cup ring to raise money for ALS and his former teammate Tony Proudfoot.

Wayne Conrad, a centre on the Alouettes' 1977 championship team, is auctioning off his Grey Cup jersey and ring to raise funds for the ALS Society of Quebec and B.C. "There's nothing you can do that's more sacred, Conrad told the Montreal Gazette's Herb Zurkowsky. "To be honest, I cherish it. I believe I have given the thing I cherish most. Do I love Tony Proudfoot? Yes, I do. Do I love his family? Yes, I do. Tony gave me that gift by calling me his friend. Money from a Vancouver fundraiser will also go to the Tony Proudfoot Fund. Proudfoot, a good friend and former teammate of Conrad's, suffers from ALS (Lou Gehrig's disease) .

External links
CFLAPEDIA BIO
FANBASE BIO

1946 births
Canadian football people from Edmonton
Canadian football offensive linemen
Calgary Dinos football players
Living people
Montreal Alouettes players
Players of Canadian football from Alberta